O'Donovan Rossa GAC Magherafelt is a Gaelic Athletic Association club based in Magherafelt, County Londonderry, Northern Ireland. The club is a member of Derry GAA and currently caters for Gaelic football, Camogie and Ladies' Gaelic football. The club is named after Irish patriot and revolutionary Jeremiah O'Donovan Rossa.

The club have won the Derry Senior Football Championship on seven occasions. Underage teams up to U-12s play in the South Derry GAA league and championships, from U-14 upwards teams compete in All-Derry competitions.

2019 Championship Football

2018 Championship Football

2017 Championship Football

History
O'Donovan Rossa GAC Magherafelt was established on 15 April 1934. The founding members were Pat McFlynn, Pat Keenan, Gerry Gallagher, Paddy Collins, John Walls, John Kearns and Charlie McFlynn.

Having recently read Patrick Pearse's graveside oration at Jeremiah O'Donovan Rossa's funeral, Pat McFlynn proposed the idea of naming the club after O'Donovan Rossa. His proposal was accepted and it was also decided that the club would play in red and white colours.

Magherafelt moved to its current ground, Rossa Park in 1941, having previously played at Bellvue Park and Millbrook Park. The club won its first Derry Senior Football Championship in 1939 and added four more in the 1940s. In 1978 after a gap of 29 years, the club won the Senior Championship for a sixth time.

Rossa Park
The club's home ground is Rossa Park, located on the road between Magherafelt and Castledawson. In the past it was the main ground for Derry GAA inter-county matches, but this ended in the 1970s. Celtic Park in Derry City is now the main county ground.

Football Titles

Senior
 Derry Senior Football Championship: 7
 1939, 1942, 1944, 1946, 1949, 1978, 2019
 Derry Senior League: 1
 2016
 Derry Junior Football Championship: 2
 1960, 1963

Minor
Derry Minor Football Championship: 5
1959, 1972, 1992, 2010,2021
Hughes/McElwee Memorial Cup: 2
2009, 2010

Under-16
 Derry Under-16 Football Championship: 8
 1958, 1959, 1964, 2004, 2009, 2015, 2016,2019
 South Derry Under-16 Football Championship: 4
 1958, 1959, 1964, 2004
 Derry Under-16 Football League: 2
 2007, 2008
 South Derry Under-16 Football League: 3
 1980,1990, 2004,
 Derry Under-16 Ladies Championship:1
 2009

Under-14
 All-Ireland Féile na nÓg: 2
 2007, 2018
 Derry Féile na nÓg: 9
 1988, 2002, 2005, 2007, 2012, 2014, 2016, 2017, 2018
 Derry Under-14 Football Championship: 4
 1987, 2005,  2014, 2015
 Derry Under-14 Football League: 5
 2007, 2012, 2014, 2015, 2016
 South Derry Under-14 Football Championship: 7
 1985, 1987, 1988, 2005, 2009, 2014, 2015 South Derry Under-14 Football League: 3
 1985, 1987, 1988, 2013, 2015 4

Note: The above lists may be incomplete. Please add any other honours you know of.

Well known footballers
Pat Keenan - National League Winning Derry Captain 1947
Francie Niblock
Father Larry Higgins
Chuck Higgins
Mickey Niblock
Hugh Niblock
Gerry O'Loughlin

See also
Derry Senior Football Championship
List of Gaelic games clubs in Derry

External links
O'Donovan Rossa GAC website

References

Gaelic games clubs in County Londonderry
Gaelic football clubs in County Londonderry
Magherafelt